The 1972 National Indoor Championships – Doubles was an event of the 1972 National Indoor Championships tennis tournament held at the Hampton Roads Coliseum in Hampton, Virginia in the United States from February 28 through March 5, 1972. Ilie Năstase and Ion Ţiriac were the defending champion. They retained their doubles title, defeating Andrés Gimeno and Manuel Orantes 7–5, 7–5 in the final.

Seeds

Draw

References

External links
 ITF tournament edition details

Tennis in Virginia
National Indoor Championships